"Gypsy Eyes" or "Gipsy Eyes" is a song written by Jimi Hendrix and performed by the Jimi Hendrix Experience for the 1968 album Electric Ladyland. Subsequently, it was released as the B-side of the "Crosstown Traffic" single, which reached number 52 on the US Billboard Hot 100 and number 37 on the UK Official Singles Chart.

Style and composition
In a review for AllMusic, Matthew Greenwald calls it "a great slice of blues/psychedelia". He adds:

Richard Middleton notes that licks in rock music are often used through a formula and variations technique and that "Gypsy Eyes" "is put together from variants of five stock ideas...familiar from other recordings in the same style."
"Drum lick A"
"Drum lick B"
"A complex of riffs on guitar and bass guitar"
"A basic melodic falling pattern, using the notes of the pentatonic scale"
"A characteristic guitar effect, the attacked single note with long decay and glissando fall"
He concludes that "the combination and variations of these formulae are many and highly imaginative. But the basic formulae are so simple that the recording could well have been worked out 'in performance.'"

References 

The Jimi Hendrix Experience songs
Songs written by Jimi Hendrix
1968 songs
Song recordings produced by Jimi Hendrix
Reprise Records singles
Track Records singles